WORL (950 kHz) is a commercial AM radio station licensed to Orlando, Florida, United States. It serves Central Florida, including the Greater Orlando radio market. The station is owned by the Salem Media Group and airs a conservative talk radio format known as "AM 950 and FM 94.9 The Answer."

WORL’s transmitter power is 12,000 watts by day, and because radio waves travel farther at night, 5,000 watts after sunset to avoid interfering with other stations on AM 950. The transmitter is off Ring Road in Orlando. Programming is also heard on a 225-watt FM translator, 94.9 W235CR in Orlando.

Programming
WORL carries most of the national Salem Radio Network hosts: Hugh Hewitt, Mike Gallagher, Dennis Prager, Jay Sekulow, Sebastian Gorka, Larry Elder and Charlie Kirk. Two local afternoon drive time shows are heard, one hosted by Chris Hart, another by Carl Jackson of WOFL.  Weekends feature shows on money, health, gardening, guns and old time radio shows. Some weekend shows are paid brokered programming. WORL is also the Orlando area affiliate for the Tampa Bay Rays Radio Network. Most hours begin with news from Townhall, a subsidiary of Salem Media.

History

WLOF
WORL originally signed on as WLOF, Orlando's second radio station. It signed on the air on October 26, 1940. WLOF broadcast at 250 watts on 1200 kilocycles. It was owned by Hazelwood, Inc., and was an NBC Blue Network affiliate, carrying its schedule of dramas, comedies, news, sports, soap operas, game shows and big band broadcasts during the "Golden Age of Radio." With the enactment of the North American Regional Broadcasting Agreement (NARBA) in 1941, it moved to 1230 kHz.

The switch to 950 kHz was completed in 1949. It continued to broadcast under the WLOF call sign until 1984. During the 1960s and 1970s, WLOF was the leading Top 40 station in Orlando. The WLOF call letters are now used by a Catholic radio station in Buffalo, New York.

WBJW and WOMX
During the 1980s and early ’90s, the station simulcast two FM stations, both on 105.1 FM. From 1984 to 1989, it was WBJW, airing a Top 40 format. From 1989 to 1995, the station's call letters were WOMX. The station aired the same programming as WOMX-FM, playing hot adult contemporary music.

WZKD
Owner NewCity Communications changed the station’s format to children's radio, affiliating with the Radio AAHS Network on December 15, 1994. The FCC granted the station's call sign change to WZKD in mid-April 1995.

The week of April 14, 1995, WZKD's morning program, Jammin' Jo Jo, increased its length by an hour. The station then built new permanent studios that would allow for tours, which the station expected to be in by mid-May. They hired local kids for specials and features and added Tommy's Clubhouse, a local weekend show. The week of August 4, 1995, the station opened up its studios up for visitors. Given Orlando's past with children's radio, even before NewCity launched a television advertising campaign in August, the station was in the top five AAHS stations in calls to the network.

In January 1997, Cox Radio, Inc. received FTC approval of its purchase of Newcity Communications, including WZKD, initiated in May 1996. In January 1998, Radio AAHS stopped broadcasting.

WTLN
In 1998, the station was bought for $500,000 by TM2, Inc.  The call sign was switched to WTLN and the format flipped to Christian talk and teaching. In 2005, the station changed hands again. Salem bought it for $9.5 million. Salem kept the Christian format in place, but added many of the national religious hosts found on other Salem stations.

For a time, programming on WTLN was simulcast on WHIM (1520 AM) in Apopka. WHIM is now WNDO, airing a Haitian Creole format and no longer owned by Salem Media.

WORL
On August 5, 2019, WTLN dropped its Christian talk and teaching format and began stunting with a continuous loop of announcements redirected listeners to 990 AM and FM 101.5, with the WTLN call sign moving to 990 AM. 950 AM took on 990's former WDYZ call sign the next day.

On August 19, 2019, WDYZ ended stunting and picked up "The Answer" conservative talk format, which moved from 660 AM. That station was acquired by JVC Media, owners of country music station WOTW; JVC also acquired the WDYZ call sign. AM 950's call sign became WORL, which had previously been used for the conservative talk format on AM 660.

Previous logos

References

External links

FCC History Cards for WORL

ORL (AM)
Radio stations established in 1940
Salem Media Group properties
1940 establishments in Florida
Talk radio stations in the United States
Conservative talk radio